Summertime is a 2015 romantic drama film directed by Catherine Corsini, who co-wrote the screenplay with Laurette Polmanss. The film stars Cécile de France, Izïa Higelin and Noémie Lvovsky. It premiered at the Locarno International Film Festival, where it won the Variety Piazza Grande Award.

Plot
Set in 1971, Delphine is the only child of French farmers and enjoys working the land. Though her father wants her to marry, Delphine is secretly pursuing a relationship with a local girl. When she goes for a rendezvous with her, her girlfriend tells her that she plans to marry, dismissing the relationship between her and Delphine as "not serious": Delphine responds by running away to Paris.

Walking down a street, Delphine encounters a group of women running by and pinching men's buttocks. When one of the men attacks one of the women, Delphine helps protect her and learns that her name is Carole. The women belong to a feminist group, which they encourage Delphine to join and participate in their protests. When one of the group members learns that her best friend, a gay man, has been committed to a mental institution by his family and is being given electroshock therapy, the rest of the group refuses at first to help rescue him. Delphine convinces them otherwise, and she, Carole and some of the other women free him. The following night, Delphine kisses Carole, who is surprised and rejects her. The next day Carole waits for Delphine in the road and tells her she is not a lesbian, but the two immediately proceed to an alley and French kiss before moving to her apartment and strip topless. Carole initially believes that it is a one-night stand, but quickly develops feelings for Delphine. She tells her boyfriend and the two struggle to work out their relationship when Carole and Delphine continuously have sex.

Delphine receives a call from her mother that her father has had a stroke. Delphine visits and realizes that she must stay to help run the farm. Taking some of the lessons she learned in the feminist collective, she represents her parents' interest to other farmers. Carole visits and decides that she cannot live without her. Leaving her boyfriend, she returns to the countryside but is surprised to learn that she and Delphine must remain discreet and closeted, as Delphine's mother does not know she is a lesbian.

Carole initially enjoys the beautiful country life and works the land with Delphine and her mother. However, she finds the people confining, as they mock her politics and it is frustrating that she is unable to openly be with Delphine. She also begins to have doubts about Delphine's intentions after Antoine, a local boy in love with Delphine since childhood, tells her that Delphine will never leave the farm and Delphine's mother tells Carole that Antoine intends to marry Delphine. Carole begins fighting with Delphine on a regular basis, which results in several people learning Delphine's secret, including a local farmer who sees them kissing in the woods, and her mother who overhears them arguing. One evening during a community gathering, the farmer who saw Carole and Delphine in the woods stalks Delphine and to cover up she kisses Antoine, but he shows dismay saying he knows why Carole is here. Distraught, she goes to Carole and cry and as she consoles the two have sex.

The following morning, Delphine's mother walks in on Carole and Delphine and finds both of them naked together in bed. Though she acts like everything is normal to Delphine, she tells Carole to leave her home, accusing her of having perverted her daughter before physically attacking her. Carole tells Delphine she is leaving and Delphine decides to run away to be with Carole. Though they leave on the train together, Delphine finds herself unable to leave. She misses their connecting train to Paris and returns home.

Five years later, Carole is working at a women's health clinic and in a lesbian relationship. She receives a letter from Delphine who says that she has finally left her parents' farm and has her own in Southern France. She tells Carole that she regrets not leaving with her five years earlier, but understands that it is impossible to turn back time.

Cast
Cécile de France as Carole  
Izïa Higelin as Delphine  
Noémie Lvovsky as Monique
Kévin Azaïs as Antoine
Lætitia Dosch as Adeline
Sarah Suco as Fabienne
Benjamin Bellecour as Manuel 
Natalie Beder as Marie-Laure
Calypso Valois as Charlotte
Jean-Henri Compère as Maurice
Bruno Podalydès as Professor Chambard
Alix Bénézech as Etudiante aux Beaux-Arts

Production
Principal photography took place in Limousin and in Paris from 22 July to 16 September 2014.

Izïa Higelin revealed that the shooting was not a pleasure, far from it: "The nude and love scenes, it is perhaps the last time for me. I really had a hard time with them, I didn't think I would dislike them that much. There weren't as many in the original script, but Catherine thought that Cecile and I were a little too friendly. So she added quite a bit. And honestly, it made me very uncomfortable. It was the first time I dared and I really didn't like doing it."

Reception
On review aggregator website Rotten Tomatoes, the film holds an approval rating of 91% based on 58 reviews, and an average rating of 6.7/10. The site consensus reads, "Summertime (La Belle Saison) presents a well-acted, beautifully framed period romance that offers a refreshing perspective on its era in the bargain". On Metacritic, the film has a weighted average score of 72 out of 100, based on 16 critics, indicating "generally favorable reviews".

Muriel Del Don of Cineuropa writes "upbeat and majestic with tragic undertones", the film is a "real emotional odyssey in which passion seems to conquer all, even the most tenacious of prejudices". In a review for Variety, Peter Debruge called it a "luminous, golden-hued period piece" and a "beautifully realized tearjerker".

Reviewing it for The Hollywood Reporter, Boyd van Hoeij said that "Though the narrative somewhat awkwardly morphs from a period drama about the French women's liberation movement in early 1970s to a more rural melodrama about being closeted and choosing between duty and family and personal happiness, the story is anchored by strong performances from Cécile de France and Izïa Higelin, who have a natural chemistry that’s not only credible but actually infectious."

Accolades

See also
List of lesbian filmmakers
List of LGBT-related films directed by women

References

Further reading
 Anderson, Melissa. Paris and Limousin Are Burning in This Great Lesbian Love Story. The Village Voice. July 18, 2016
Ide, Wendy.  Summertime review – potent romance. The Guardian. July 17, 2016
Mobarak, Jared.  Summertime. The Film Stage. July 20, 2016 
Scott, A. O.  Review: Warm Burst of Romantic Bliss in ‘Summertime’. The New York Times. July 21, 2016
Toumarkine, Doris. Filmmaker of All Seasons: Catherine Corsini’s ‘Summertime’ is a ’70s tale of sexual liberation. Film Journal International. July 22, 2016
Turan, Kenneth. 'Summertime' a warm embrace of a French same-sex couple's evolving relationship. Los Angeles Times. July 21, 2016

External links
 Summertime at Pyramide Films
 Summertime at Strand Releasing
 

2015 LGBT-related films
2015 romantic drama films
2010s feminist films
2010s French films
2010s French-language films
Belgian LGBT-related films
Belgian romantic drama films
Films directed by Catherine Corsini
Films set in the 1970s
French feminist films
French LGBT-related films
French romantic drama films
French-language Belgian films
Lesbian-related films
LGBT-related romantic drama films